Daniil Serhiyovych Khrypchuk (born 9 December 2003) is a Ukrainian professional footballer who plays as a midfielder for Vorskla Poltava in the Ukrainian Premier League.

Career
Khrypchuk is a product of Youth Sportive School #9 and Metalist in Kharkiv and Dynamo Kyiv systems. 

In September 2020 he was signed by Vorskla Poltava. He made his debut as a second half-taim substituted player for Vorskla Poltava in the Ukrainian Premier League in a home winning match against Zorya Luhansk on 17 April 2021.

International career
In March 2021, Khrypchuk was called up to the preliminary squad of the Ukraine national under-18 football team, with which he was expected to participated in the training preparation to qualifying matches for the youth Euro 2022, but later the training was canceled due to the coronavirus pandemic.

References

External links
 
 

2003 births
Living people
Footballers from Kharkiv
Ukrainian footballers
FC Vorskla Poltava players
Ukrainian Premier League players
Ukraine youth international footballers

Association football midfielders